Stemonocoleus is a genus of flowering plants in the family, Fabaceae. It belongs to the subfamily Detarioideae. It contains a single species, Stemonocoleus micranthus.

Detarioideae
Monotypic Fabaceae genera